Charles Warren Stone (June 29, 1843 – August 15, 1912) was a Republican member of the U.S. House of Representatives from Pennsylvania and the second lieutenant governor of Pennsylvania.

Early life
Charles W. Stone was born near Groton, Massachusetts.  He attended Lawrence Academy at Groton, and graduated from Williams College in Williamstown, Massachusetts, in 1863.  He moved to Pennsylvania in 1863 and settled in Warren.  He served as superintendent of schools of Warren County, Pennsylvania, in 1865.  He studied law, was admitted to the bar in 1867 and commenced practice in Warren.  He was a trustee of Pennsylvania State College.

Personal life

He married Lizzie Moorhead, a native of Erie, of which her father was one of the oldest citizens. She attended the Erie Academy, in which she afterwards taught. Stone taught in this academy, and it is in this way they met. They had 4 daughters and 2 sons. The eldest son acted as Stone's private secretary, and the youngest attended the preparatory department of Columbia College. The eldest daughter married Mr. Allen, of Warren. The second daughter, Ann, was an interesting young woman and a favorite in Washington society and attended school near Philadelphia and afterwards traveled in Europe. The third daughter, Bessie, attended Baltimore College.

Career
Stone served as member of the Pennsylvania State House of Representatives in 1870 and 1871, and served in the Pennsylvania State Senate in 1877 and 1878.  He was Lieutenant Governor of Pennsylvania during the term of Governor Henry M. Hoyt, from 1879 to 1883.  He was appointed secretary of the Commonwealth on January 18, 1887, and served until his resignation to accept nomination for Congress.

Stone was elected as a Republican to the Fifty-first Congress to fill the vacancy caused by the death of Lewis F. Watson.  He was reelected to the Fifty-second and to the three succeeding Congresses.  He served as chairman of the United States House Committee on Coinage, Weights, and Measures during the Fifty-fourth and Fifty-fifth Congresses.  He was an unsuccessful candidate for reelection in 1898.  He was also an unsuccessful candidate for Governor of Pennsylvania in 1898.  He resumed the practice of law and died at his home near Warren, Pennsylvania.  Interment in Oakland Cemetery in Pleasant Township, Pennsylvania.

The Honorable Charles Warren Stone Museum was added to the National Register of Historic Places in 1976.

References

Sources

The Political Graveyard

1912 deaths
Lieutenant Governors of Pennsylvania
Republican Party members of the Pennsylvania House of Representatives
Republican Party Pennsylvania state senators
Pennsylvania lawyers
1843 births
Republican Party members of the United States House of Representatives from Pennsylvania
People from Groton, Massachusetts
19th-century American politicians
Williams College alumni
19th-century American lawyers